Rom Stanifer (February 24, 1904 – August 22, 1970) was an American sports shooter. He competed in the 50 m rifle, prone event at the 1932 Summer Olympics.

References

1904 births
1970 deaths
American male sport shooters
Olympic shooters of the United States
Shooters at the 1932 Summer Olympics
People from Dublin, Texas
Sportspeople from Texas